The Sările-Bisoca mine is a large salt mine located in eastern Romania in Buzău County, close to Bisoca. Sările-Bisoca represents one of the largest salt reserves in Romania having estimated reserves of 13 billion tonnes of NaCl.

References 

Salt mines in Romania